Rabies is a viral disease that causes inflammation of the brain in humans and other mammals caused by lyssaviruses.

Rabies  may also refer to:

 Rabies virus (Rabies lyssavirus), the type species of the Lyssavirus viral genus

Arts and entertainment
 Rabies (1958 film), by Ingmar Bergman
 Rabies (2010 film), an Israeli film by Aharon Keshales and Navot Papushado
 Rabies (novel), a 1983 novel by Borislav Pekić
 Rabies (Ruoska album), 2008
 Rabies (Skinny Puppy album), 1989

See also
 Lyssaviruses, including the rabies virus and 
 Australian bat lyssavirus
 Rabi (disambiguation)
 Rabies in popular culture